Just Mobile (stylised as JUST Mobile) was a prepay mobile virtual network operator in the Republic of Ireland which operated on the Vodafone Ireland network.  It was founded in October 2010 and ceased operating 10 months later, in August 2011.

History
Founded by Donal Lawless and Stuart Kelly, the company was funded by the founders and a BES fund managed by   Powerscourt Capital Partners, an investment firm led by Irish entrepreneur Seán Melly.  Melly was also chairman of Just Mobile.  The company was incorporated in 2007, and launched to customers in October 2010.  Upon launch, it created approximately 25 jobs, with plans to create up to 70 jobs in its first two years.  Under its Just Cause scheme, the company made charitable donations of 5% of the value of every top-up.

Closure
In August 2011, the company announced that it had failed to acquire the required funding to continue operating.  On 2 August 2011, the Commission for Communications Regulation announced that Just Mobile would cease operations gradually, until final closure on 19 August 2011.

References

Mobile virtual network operators
Telecommunications companies of the Republic of Ireland
Telecommunications in the Republic of Ireland